Transitivity or transitive may refer to:

Grammar
 Transitivity (grammar), a property of verbs that relates to whether a verb can take direct objects
 Transitive verb, a verb which takes an object
 Transitive case, a grammatical case to mark arguments of a transitive verb

Logic and mathematics
 Transitive group action
 Transitive relation, a binary relation in which if A is related to B and B is related to C, then A is related to C
 Syllogism, a related notion in propositional logic
 Intransitivity, properties of binary relations in mathematics
 Arc-transitive graph, a graph whose automorphism group acts transitively upon ordered pairs of adjacent vertices
 Edge-transitive graph, a graph whose automorphism group acts transitively upon its edges
 Vertex-transitive graph, a graph whose automorphism group acts transitively upon its vertices
 Transitive set a set A such that whenever x ∈ A, and y ∈ x, then y ∈ A
 Topological transitivity property of a continuous map for which every open subset U''' of the phase space intersects every other open subset V'', when going along trajectory

Other
 Transitive Corporation, a computer software firm that developed QuickTransit cross-platform virtualization
 Transitive dependency, a functional dependency of database management which holds by virtue of transitive relation

See also
 Intransitive (disambiguation)